The March 721 is a Formula One car, designed, developed, and made by March Engineering for the 1972 Formula One season. It was powered by the  Ford-Cosworth DFV engine. It was driven by Ronnie Peterson, Niki Lauda, Henri Pescarolo, Carlos Pace, and Mike Beuttler.

Racing history
The 721 was the successor model to the March 711 and, after the strong 1971 season, was intended to secure March's leap to the top of the Formula 1 constructors. It came in three versions: the traditional 721, the 721X, and the 721G.

The basic version of the 721, which did not have an additional designation in the form of a letter, was a slightly improved version of the old 711 and was built for customers such as Frank Williams Racing Cars and Günther Hennerici's Eifelland. It also served as an interim car for the factory team until the new 721X was ready. Eifelland's car was fitted with a new bodywork designed by Luigi Colani and was renamed as Eifelland E21.

The March 721X was a completely new design. The rear springs were highly hinged and could be operated via levers and springs. Designer Robin Herd wanted to create a low moment of inertia by concentrating most of the car's weight in the middle of the car. Alfa Romeo provided a transversal gearbox, fitted between the Cosworth DFV engine and the rear axle. In theory, this design made sense, but the Goodyear racing tires that March used in 1972 never really harmonized with the chassis. The front tires were constantly being overloaded, causing oversteer and understeer. The drivers couldn't handle the car and the 721X is generally viewed as a bad design. Niki Lauda, one of the March factory drivers of 1972, called the 721X "a complete failure", "a stillbirth" and "a debacle".

Seeing that the car was a failure, March built an alternative model, the 721G, in just nine days to avert a complete failure in the 1972 season. For the 721G, a conventional Formula 2 chassis from the March 722 was adapted for Formula 1. Suspension and brakes were from the customer version of the 721, and the powerplant was again the Cosworth DFV V8 engine. In 1972, March had built three Formula 1 model within a year. Ronnie Peterson took third place with the G-Type at the German Grand Prix. Niki Lauda remained pointless with the March in his first full Formula 1 season.

References

March Formula One cars